The following is the official canvassing of votes by the Batasang Pambansa for the 1981 Philippine presidential election. The canvassing started on June 20, 1981 and ended on June 21, 1981.

Votes for the provinces of Aurora and Batanes were not included as the certificates of the votes for these provinces were delivered late due to inclement weather.

Notes

References 

1981 in the Philippines